Ross Chapman (born 22 October 1952) is an Australian cricketer. He played one first-class match for New South Wales in 1972/73. He was educated at North Sydney Boys High School and played grade cricket for North Sydney District Cricket Club. He became a Boarding House Master at The Kings School Parramatta and later Brisbane Grammar School. He was the Team Psychologist for the Australian Cricket Team.

See also
 List of New South Wales representative cricketers

References

External links
 

1952 births
Living people
Australian cricketers
New South Wales cricketers
Cricketers from Newcastle, New South Wales
People educated at North Sydney Boys High School